Bocock Peak Provincial Park is a provincial park in British Columbia, Canada, located in the Hart Ranges of the Northern Rocky Mountains to the north of the summit of the Pine Pass on BC Highway 97.

References

External links

Parks in the Canadian Rockies
Provincial parks of British Columbia
2000 establishments in British Columbia